The men's 100 metres at the 1983 IAAF World Championships was held at the Olympic Stadium in Helsinki, Finland on 7 and 8 August 2022. 67 athletes from 49 nations entered to the competition

Records
Existing records at the start of the event.

Results

Qualifying heats
The qualifying heats took place on 7 August, with the 67 athletes involved being splitted into 9 heats. The first 3 athletes in each heat ( Q ) and the next 5 fastest ( q ) qualified for the quarter-finals. 

Wind:
Heat 1: –1.0 m/s, Heat 2: +1.8 m/s, Heat 3: +1.2 m/s, Heat 4: –0.2 m/s, Heat 5: +0.7m/s, Heat 6: –0.5 m/s, Heat 7: +1.8 m/s, Heat 8: +2.3 m/s, Heat 9: +1.3 m/s

Quarter-finals
The quarter-finals took place on 7 August, with the 32 athletes involved being splitted into 4 heats. The first 4 athletes in each heat ( Q ) qualified for the semifinals. 

Wind:
Heat 1: +1.1 m/s, Heat 2: +0.8 m/s, Heat 3: –1.1 m/s, Heat 4: –1.2 m/s

Semifinals
The semifinals took place on 8 August, with the 16 athletes involved being splitted into 2 heats. The first 4 athletes in each heat ( Q ) qualified for the final. 

Wind:
Heat 1: –0.8 m/s, Heat 2: –1.0 m/s

Final
The final took place on August 8.

Wind: -0.3 m/s

References
 Results

100 metres at the World Athletics Championships
Events at the 1983 World Championships in Athletics